Kentavros Vrilission F.C. (Greek: Ποδοσφαιρικός Αθλητικός Όμιλος Βριλησσίων Κένταυρος) is a football  club, based in Vrilissia, Athens. The Greek club was founded in the autumn of 2003 and participates in the first Athens domestic football league (E.P.S.A.).

References 

2003 establishments in Greece
Association football clubs established in 2003
Football clubs in Athens